Leichhardt pine can refer to two species of trees:

Neolamarckia cadamba, the kadam tree
Nauclea orientalis, the Leichhardt tree or the yellow cheesewood